The Mayor of Barnsley is a ceremonial post held by a member of Barnsley Metropolitan Borough Council, elected annually by the Council. The post was previously given to members of the Municipal Borough of Barnsley from 1869 to 1912, and to members of the County Borough of Barnsley from 1913 to 1974.

Some notable mayors

The first mayor of Barnsley was Henry Richardson, in 1869; he had been "instrumental in the founding of the Borough." The first female mayor, elected by a labour-controlled council, was Mary Brannon in 1956. After her election, she removed seven pictures of the Royal Family from the mayoral parlour, and replaced them with local scenes created by art students. Brannon said, "I got bored stiff with the sameness of the photographs." It was Brannon who on 6 May 1957 opened the Edward Sheerien Secondary Modern School, the first of its kind to be built in the borough since World War II. In 1929 Sheerien had also been mayor, and the school was named after him with respect to his "great services to the borough," including over 25 years' duty on the education committee.

List of mayors of the Municipal Borough of Barnsley
Source.

List of mayors of the County Borough of Barnsley

Source.

List of mayors of the Metropolitan Borough of Barnsley

Source.

Notes and references

Barnsley
Ceremonial officers in the United Kingdom